Double bubble may refer to:

Mathematics and computer science
Double bubble theorem, that the minimum surface surrounding two given volumes is formed by three spherical patches meeting at a common circle, and the "standard double bubble", the name for this surface
Double bubble map, a graphical information visualization technique
Double bubble sort, a variation of the bubble sort algorithm

Biology and medicine
Double bubble (radiology), a symptom of a bowel obstruction formed by two air-filled bubbles in the abdomen
Double bubble mint, a plant native to the southwestern US

Music and entertainment
"Double Bubble", a track on jazz-fusion music album Southern Comfort (The Crusaders album)
"Double Bubble", an episode of British medical television drama Holby City (series 14).
"Double Bubble", an episode of animated television series The Little Mermaid
"Double Bubble", an episode of American medical television drama Trapper John, M.D.
Double Bubble (2008), a hip hop/electronic dance music album by Stereo MCs
"The Double Bubble Duchess", one of the songs in Charlie and the Chocolate Factory (musical)
"Double Bubble Trouble", a song by M.I.A.
"Double Bubble", a short story by Alistair Fruish, included in his novel Kiss My ASBO

Other
Double bubble roof, a design feature of Zagato automobiles and some aircraft
Dubble Bubble bubble gum
Double Bubble, a commonly-offered bonus payout in Bingo in the United Kingdom
Double Bubble, a style of Reebok Freestyle shoes
The Aurora D8 aeroplane concept, nicknamed the "double bubble" for its shape
Double bubble nebula, in astronomy, planetary nebula NGC 2371-2 in Gemini

See also
Double-double (disambiguation)
Fermi bubble, a large double bubble structure of plasma above and below the plane of the Milky Way galaxy.